Father There Is Only One 3 is a 2022 Spanish Christmas comedy film directed and starred by Santiago Segura. It is a sequel to box-office hits Father There Is Only One and Father There Is Only One 2. The cast is completed by the likes of Toni Acosta, Carlos Iglesias, and Loles León.

Plot 
The plot tracks the developments in the García Loyola family as Christmas looms in, including the kids breaking a Nativity scene figurine and the eldest sibling breaking up with her boyfriend.

Cast

Production 
The film is a Bowfinger International Pictures, Atresmedia Cine and Padre no hay más que uno 3 AIE production, with the association of Sony Pictures International Productions and the participation of Atresmedia and Prime Video. Filming began in the Madrid's Plaza Mayor in December 2021. Carlos Iglesias replaced Antonio Resines (originally cast as the family's grandfather) owing to the latter's December 2021 hospitalization from COVID-19.

Release 
Distributed by Sony Pictures Entertainment Iberia, the film was theatrically released in Spain on 14 July 2022. It grossed €745,000 (over 108,000 admissions) in its opening day, making the best debut for a Spanish film in the domestic market since 2015, and becoming the highest-grossing Spanish release in 2022 already after its first (4-day) weekend in theatres.

Reception 
Fausto Fernández of Fotogramas rated the film 3 out of 5 stars assessing it to be "a comedy with a lot of angel", while pointing out that it was short in cameos.

Carlos Marañón of Cinemanía rated the film 2 out of 5 stars, deeming the third installment of the saga to be "flat, with some steep, colorful tacks, such as the small tribute to La gran familia".

Raquel Hernández Luján of HobbyConsolas scored 50 out of 100 points ("so-so"), criticising the "blatant product placement, the lack of substance in the story and the genre clichés", while drawing out the 2-year-old addition to the ensemble cast (featuring in some of the most endearing moments) as the best thing about the film.

Javier Ocaña of El País  wrote that the "insignificant" film features "a monotonous rhythm, modest performances, little or no humor in the situations and no comic tempo in the dialogues, in the replies and counter-replies", being "simply as indolent as any Spanish production for children of the 1970s and 1980s".

See also 
 List of Spanish films of 2022
 List of Christmas films

References 

Atresmedia Cine films
Spanish Christmas comedy films
2022 comedy films
Films shot in Madrid
2020s Spanish-language films
2020s Christmas comedy films
Bowfinger International Pictures films
2020s Spanish films